Olpae or Olpai was a fortress of Ozolian Locris.

References

Populated places in Ozolian Locris
Former populated places in Greece
Lost ancient cities and towns